The Rhode Island Gulls were a team in the United States Basketball League (USBL) based in Warwick, Rhode Island during the 1985 and 1987 seasons. They had many notable former players such as Manute Bol, Spud Webb, John "Hot Rod" Williams, Muggsy Bogues and Robert Rose.

References

External links
Getty Images: "Rhode Island Gulls Manute Bol and Spud Webb"

United States Basketball League teams
Basketball teams in Rhode Island